Étienne Clémentel (11 January 1864 – 25 December 1936) was a French politician. He served as a member of the National Assembly of France from 1900 to 1919 and as French Senator from 1920 to 1936. He also served as Minister of Colonies from 24 January 1905 to 14 March 1906, Minister of Agriculture from 22 March 1913 to 9 December 1913 and Minister of Finance from 9 June 1914 to 13 June 1914. He was the first president of International Court of Arbitration
He was Minister of Commerce, Industry, Posts and Telegraphs from 29 October 1915 to 27 November 1919.

Biography
Étienne Clémentel was born on 11 January 1864 in Clermont-Ferrand, Puy-de-Dôme, France. He was trained as property solicitor.

He was also a painter and a photographer. Some of his work can be found in the Musée d'Orsay.

He died on 25 December 1936 in Prompsat, Puy-de-Dôme, France.

Legacy
 His bust, sculpted by Auguste Rodin, can be found in the Musée Rodin.

References

External links
    
 

1864 births
1936 deaths
Artists from Clermont-Ferrand
Politicians from Clermont-Ferrand
Radical Party (France) politicians
French Ministers of Commerce, Industry, Posts, and Telegraphs
French Ministers of Overseas France
French Ministers of Finance
French Ministers of Agriculture
Members of the 7th Chamber of Deputies of the French Third Republic
Members of the 8th Chamber of Deputies of the French Third Republic
Members of the 9th Chamber of Deputies of the French Third Republic
Members of the 10th Chamber of Deputies of the French Third Republic
Members of the 11th Chamber of Deputies of the French Third Republic
French Senators of the Third Republic
Senators of Puy-de-Dôme
French photographers
19th-century French painters
French male painters
20th-century French painters
20th-century French male artists
19th-century French male artists